Al-Wasik Billah al-Majid Sheikh Taimur bin Faisal bin Turki, KCIE, CSI (1886 – 28 January 1965) was the sultan of Muscat and Oman from 5 October 1913 to 10 February 1932. He was born at Muscat and succeeded his father Faisal bin Turki, Sultan of Muscat and Oman as Sultan.

Early life

When he assumed suzerainty over the country, he inherited an external public debt and widespread rebellion among the tribes. Between 1915 and 1920, the sultan's forces were aided by British financial and matériel support against the rebel tribes, ensuring adequate resistance but not total victory. An uneasy situation of no war, no peace, existed, with the sultan controlling Muscat and the coastal towns (the former Sultanate of Muscat) and the imam ruling the interior (Oman proper). This was tacitly codified in the Treaty of As Sib in 1920, brokered by the British political agent in Muscat. The treaty was between the sultan and the tribes, represented by Shaikh Isa ibn Salih al Harthi, leader of the Al Harth tribe.

Personal life

Taimur Bin Faisal had six children. The current sultan of Oman, Haitham bin Tariq Al Said, is the grandson of Taimur bin Faisal bin Turki.

 Sultan Said bin Taimur Al-Said
 Sayyid Majid bin Taimur Al-Sa’id
 Sayyid Tariq bin Taimur Al-Sa’id
 Sayyid Fahr bin Taimur Al-Sa’id
 Sayyid Shabib bin Taimur Al-Sa’id
 Sayyida Bouthaina bint Taimur Al-Sa’id

Politics

In return for full autonomy, the tribes in the interior pledged to cease attacking the coast. The Treaty of As Sib was a de facto partition agreement between Muscat and Oman, serving Britain's interest in preserving its power through the office of the sultan without dispatching British troops to the region. The Treaty of As Sib ensured political quiescence between Muscat and Oman that lasted until the 1950s, when oil exploration in the interior reintroduced conflict. In return for accepting a truncation of his authority, the sultan received a loan from the government of British India with an amortization period of ten years, sufficient to repay his debts to merchants. When Sultan Taimur ibn Faisal abdicated for financial reasons in 1932, the twenty-two-year-old Said ibn Taimur inherited an administration that was in debt.

A United States Department of State bulletin on the sultan of Muscat and Oman in February 1938 describes the situation in which Sultan Said ibn Taimur found himself after assuming power: "The young Sultan found the country practically bankrupt and his troubles were further complicated by tribal unrest and conspiracy by certain of his uncles, one of whom immediately profited by the occasion to set up an independent regime. The Sultan tackled the situation with resolution and within a short time the traitorous uncle had been subdued, unrest quelled, and most important of all, state finances put on much more solid footing."

Abdication

In 1932 he abdicated in favour of his eldest son Said bin Taimur when he married Kiyoko Ooyama, a Japanese woman. Afterwards, bin Feisal lived abroad, mostly in British India. In 1965, he died in Bombay, India. He was married six times and had five sons, including Said bin Taimur and Tariq bin Taimur, and one daughter.

Ibadism

Taimur's era was the period wherein Ibadism, the predominant madhab of Oman had played a role in the country's social affairs. For instance, the government which led from Muscat had exchanged letters with the ruling powers of the interior, which consisted of an Ibadi imamate. This Ibadi involvement in the stepping stone in Oman's history that occurred in 1920 was called the treaty of Sib.

References

1886 births
1965 deaths
19th-century Omani people
20th-century Omani people
Al Said dynasty
Honorary Companions of the Order of the Star of India
Honorary Knights Commander of the Order of the Indian Empire
Monarchs who abdicated
Japan–Oman relations
Omani Ibadi Muslims
People from Muscat, Oman
Sons of Omani sultans
Sultans of Oman